is a Japanese physician and scholar on cardiological imaging in Japan, an ex-professor at Toho University, school of medicine, Tokyo, and a councillor of the University.

Born in Shizuoka Prefecture, Japan in 1932, he graduated from Toho University in 1962. In 1979, he became vice-director of Omori Hospital attached to Toho University. After retiring as a professor in 1998, he served as director of Ofuna Chūō General Hospital in Kamakura until March 2006. He became director of Nukada Memorial Hospital in Kamakura in June 2006.

External links
 Nukada Memorial Hospital

Japanese cardiologists
1932 births
Living people
Japanese healthcare managers